Steele Rudd was the pen name of Arthur Hoey Davis (14 November 1868 – 11 October 1935) an Australian author, best known for his short story collection On Our Selection.

In 2009, as part of the Q150 celebrations, Rudd was named one of the Q150 Icons for his role in Queensland literature.

Early life
Davis was born at Drayton near Toowoomba, Queensland, the son of Thomas Davis (1828–1904), a blacksmith from Abernant in south Wales who arrived to Australia in 1847 due to a five-year conviction for petty theft, and Mary, née Green (1835–1893) an Irishwoman from Galway who was driven to emigrate by the Great Famine. The boy was the eighth child and fifth son in a family of 13 children. The father later on took up a selection at Emu Creek, and there Davis was educated at the local school. He left school before he was 12 and worked at odd jobs on a station, and at 15 years of age became a junior stockrider on a station on the Darling Downs. When he was 18 he was appointed a junior clerk in the office of the curator of intestate estates at Brisbane.

In 1889, Davis was transferred to the sheriff's office and in his spare time took up rowing and when he began writing a column on rowing in a weekly paper and needed a pseudonym he adopted "Steele Rudder", the first name from the English essayist Richard Steele, the second chosen because he wanted to bring into his name some part of a boat. Later it was shortened to "Steele Rudd". During his time as under sheriff, Davis had to give the signal at the hanging of Patrick Kenniff which left him nervous and irritable for months after the event.

Writing career
Towards the end of 1895 Davis sent a sketch based on his father's experience 'Starting the selection' to The Bulletin. The sketch was published on 14 December 1895. This afterwards became the first chapter of On Our Selection when it was published in 1899. Encouraged by J. F. Archibald, Davis continued the series of sketches, 26 of which were included in the volume. Within four years 20,000 copies had been printed. It afterwards appeared in numerous cheap editions and by 1940 the number of copies sold had reached 250,000. The stories have also been the basis of a play and several films.

In 1903 Our New Selection appeared and in the same year Davis, who had reached the position of under-sheriff, retired from the public service. In January 1904, Davis brought out Rudd's Magazine, a monthly magazine published at 6d. a copy, which continued for nearly four years. It was issued first from Brisbane and was afterwards transferred to Sydney. It had a much longer life than most Australian magazines, but there was not then a large enough public in Australia to enable a cheap popular magazine to be successful. It was revived under various names between 1923 and 1930.

Davis published a long series of volumes continuing the On Our Selection series, as listed below. Most were successful, but there could not have been a great deal of profit for the author from the cheap editions. Towards the end of his life appeared two capable books The Romance of Runnibede (1927), and Green Grey Homestead (1934). But Davis found that having established a reputation in one direction, it was difficult to find a public for books written in more serious vein, and during his last years he had to struggle to make a living. He died at Brisbane on 11 October 1935. Davis was twice married and was survived by three sons and a daughter by the first marriage. In addition to the volumes mentioned others will be found listed in Miller's Australian Literature.

Davis was a tall, ruddy-faced man of mercurial temperament, fiery of temper, an excellent talker and a charming companion. He had a great love for horses and for 20 years was a well-known polo player. His books were written largely from the experiences of his own early days, and they were thoroughly appreciated by a generation that was familiar with characters on the land who had all the courage, optimism and humour of dad and mum and the other members of the family.

His reputation was established by his short stories of country life. The 1920 movie On Our Selection and 1932–1952 radio series Dad and Dave helped turn the characters into Australian cultural icons.

Davis, however, detested his struggling but admirable family being made into comic yokels, and had nothing to do with the radio program. There is no character called 'Mabel' attached to Dave anywhere in the entire Rudd canon of fiction: Dave briefly had a girlfriend called Fanny in one story, and he eventually married a girl called Lily. Davis had a profound respect for the pioneering Australian woman, and he was particularly incensed by the use of 'Mum' when referring to Mrs Rudd. "'It is 'Mother', 'Mother', Mother!' he would shout, flushed in the face."

Examples of popular 'Dad and Dave' jokes that did not originate from Rudd:

 Dad: Where's Dave gone, Mum?

 Mum: Dave's out Condobolin, Dad.

 Dad: Out Condobolin? Cripes, I didn't think Dave had any time for the womenfolk!

 Dave: Hey Dad! Them telephone blokes are silly coots! One of them just rung up to say it's a long distance from Sydney!

The humour of Rudd's Selection stories arises from character and situation, and never involves wisecracks like these.

A replica of Rudd's shingle hut can still be seen at the town of Nobby, Queensland. There is a statue of Steele Rudd at the Speakers' Corner in King George Square in Brisbane. There is also a residential college named "Steele Rudd" at the University of Southern Queensland campus.

There are copper statues of Dad, Dave, Mum and Mabel at Gundagai.

Bibliography

Novels

 In Australia (1908)
 Duncan McClure : Being Part II of 'The Poor Parson' (1909)
 The Book of Dan (1911)
 The Old Homestead (1913)
 Memoirs of Corporal Keeley (1918)
 We Kaytons (1919)
 On Emu Creek (1922)
 Me an' th' Son (1924)
 The Miserable Clerk (1924)
 The Romance of Runnibede (1927)
 Green Grey Homestead (1934)

Short story collections
 On Our Selection (1899) (sold over 250,000 copies)
 Our New Selection (1903)
 Sandy's Selection (1904)
 Back at Our Selection (1906)
 The Poor Parson (1907)
 Dad in Politics and Other Stories (1908)
 For Life and Other Stories (1908)
 Stocking Our Selection (1909)
 From Selection to City (1909)
 On an Australian Farm (1910)
 The Dashwoods (1911)
 Grandpa's Selection (1916)
 The Rudd Family (1926) illustrated by Percy Lindsay

Quotation
In his 1908 book, Dad in Politics, Davis satirises political life in the opening sentence:

This quotation is often used to illustrate the cynicism of Australians towards the political class. FitzHenry notes that Davis's satirical depiction of individual members of the Queensland Parliament was so close to reality that he was almost called to the Bar of the House of Parliament for breach of parliamentary privilege.

Dramatisation
 1912 Our Selection was performed as adapted by actor Bert Bailey ( 1868–1935)

A play titled The Execution of Steele Rudd by Australian playwright Harry Reade was first staged in 1981 by the National Theatre at the Playhouse, Perth, directed by Stephen Barry. It portrays the character and actions of Davis who is employed in the sheriff's office, managing arrangements for the execution of two criminals. The play was also staged by Melbourne's Playbox Theatre in 1983.

See also
Selection (Australian history)

References

Bibliography

External links 
 
 
 
 Listen to the first episode of 'Dad and Dave from Snake Gully' from 1937 on australianscreen online
 'Dad and Dave from Snake Gully' was added to the National Film and Sound Archive's Sounds of Australia registry in 2007
 Dad & Dave at Snake Gully – film & TV series
 
 Julieanne Lamond 'The Ghost of Dad Rudd, On the Stump' JASAL 6 (2007)
 Steele Rudd at Live Performance Australia Hall of Fame

1868 births
1935 deaths
Australian male short story writers
People from Toowoomba
Burials at Toowong Cemetery
19th-century Australian short story writers
20th-century Australian short story writers
20th-century Australian novelists
20th-century Australian male writers